The play-offs of the UEFA Euro 2024 qualifying tournament will decide the last three teams that will qualify for the UEFA Euro 2024 final tournament in Germany. The twelve participants of the play-offs will be selected based on their performance in the 2022–23 UEFA Nations League. The teams will be divided into three paths, each containing four teams, with each play-off path featuring two single-leg semi-finals, and one single-leg final. The three play-off path winners will join hosts Germany and the twenty other teams already qualified for UEFA Euro 2024.

Format
The twelve teams will be selected based on their performance in the 2022–23 UEFA Nations League. These teams will be divided into three paths, each containing four teams, with one team from each path qualifying for the final tournament.

The format is similar to that of the UEFA Euro 2020 qualifying play-offs. However, given there is one fewer qualifying spot available (as no host qualified automatically for Euro 2020), and the UEFA Nations League was restructured from the 2020–21 season, the play-offs now feature only three paths, with the now-downsized League D no longer given its own path.

Team selection
Based on the Nations League rankings, the twelve selected teams will be chosen as follows, starting with League C and working up to League A:

 All available group winners will be selected.
 If a group winner has directly qualified through the UEFA Euro 2024 qualifying group stage, then they will be replaced by the next best-ranked team from the same league that has not also directly qualified.
 If fewer than four teams from a given league have failed to qualify, then the remaining slots for that league will be allocated as follows:
 The best-ranked group winner of League D will be selected, unless this team has directly qualified.
 Remaining slots will be allocated based on the Nations League overall ranking:
 If the league has a group winner selected for the play-offs, then the next-best team in the overall ranking from a lower league will be selected.
 If the league has no group winner available, then the best team in the overall ranking will be selected.

Path formation
The twelve selected teams will then be allocated to paths of four teams. The draw to allocate teams to the different paths will be subject to the following general conditions:

 If four or more teams from a league enter the play-offs, a path with four teams from the league in question has to be formed.
 League B and C group winners cannot form a path with a team from a higher league.
 Additional conditions may be applied, including seeding principles, subject to approval of the UEFA Executive Committee.

With these conditions, the draw procedure is as follows, starting with League C and working up to League A:

 If there are four teams available in a given league, form a path with these four teams.
 If there are more than four teams available in a given league, draw which four teams will participate in the path of the league.
 Remaining teams will be drawn into a path of a higher league.
 If there are less than four teams available in a given league, draw available and eligible teams from other leagues so that four teams compose the path of the given league.

Match pairings and rules
Each play-off path will feature two single-leg semi-finals, and one single-leg final, taking place in March 2024. In the semi-finals of each path, based on the Nations League rankings, the best-ranked team will host the fourth-ranked team, and the second-ranked team will host the third-ranked team. The host of the final will be decided by a draw between the two semi-final pairings.

The play-offs are played in single-leg knockout matches. If scores are level at the end of normal time, 30 minutes of extra time is played, followed by a penalty shoot-out if the scores remain tied.

Teams selected
The team selection process, using a set of criteria, will determine the twelve teams that will compete in the play-offs based on the Nations League overall rankings.

Key
GW Group winner from Nations League A, B or C
BD Best group winner from Nations League D
 Team is assured at least a play-off spot based on Nations League ranking, but may still qualify directly
 UEFA Euro 2024 host, qualified automatically
 Banned from qualifying competition

Draw
The qualifying play-off draw will follow the [[UEFA Euro 2020 qualifying play-offs#Path formation|path formation rules]] to determine the paths in which the non-group winners will participate, if required. Three separate draws determining the host of the play-off final of each path will also take place between the winners of the semi-final pairings.

Schedule
The semi-finals will take place on 21 March, while the final matches will take place five days later on 26 March 2024.

Times are CET (UTC+1), as listed by UEFA (local times are in parentheses).

Path A

Bracket

Summary

|-
| colspan="3" style="text-align:center; background:whitesmoke;" | Semi-finals

|-
| colspan="3" style="text-align:center; background:whitesmoke;" | Final

|}

Semi-finals

Final

Path B

Bracket

Summary

|-
| colspan="3" style="text-align:center; background:whitesmoke;" | Semi-finals

|-
| colspan="3" style="text-align:center; background:whitesmoke;" | Final

|}

Semi-finals

Final

Path C

Bracket

Summary

|-
| colspan="3" style="text-align:center; background:whitesmoke;" | Semi-finals

|-
| colspan="3" style="text-align:center; background:whitesmoke;" | Final

|}

Semi-finals

Final

Discipline
A player is automatically suspended for the next match for the following offences:
 Receiving a red card (red card suspensions may be extended for serious offences)

Yellow card suspensions from the qualifying group stage are not carried forward to the play-offs.

References

External links
UEFA Euro 2024, UEFA.com
European Qualifiers, UEFA.com 

Play-offs
March 2024 sports events in Europe